Expressionism in Philosophy: Spinoza is a 1968 book by the philosopher Gilles Deleuze, in which the author conceives Baruch Spinoza as a solitary thinker who envisioned philosophy as an enterprise of liberation and radical demystification. Deleuze sees how the univocity of Being fits into the theory of substance and looks into the relationship between the theory of ideas and the production of truth and sense, the organisation of affect (elimination of sad passions) to achieve joy, and the organization of affect in the theory of modes.

Publication history
Expressionism in Philosophy: Spinoza was first published by Les Éditions de Minuit in 1968. In 1990, Zone Books published Martin Joughin's English translation.

Reception
The philosopher Alan D. Schrift wrote in The Cambridge Dictionary of Philosophy (2015) that, together with Deleuze's Spinoza: Practical Philosophy (1970), Expressionism in Philosophy: Spinoza "influenced several generations of French Spinozism".

References

Bibliography
Books

 
 

Online articles

 

1968 non-fiction books
Books about Baruch Spinoza
French non-fiction books
Les Éditions de Minuit books
Works by Gilles Deleuze